The Zulu people are a South African ethnic group. Many Zulu musicians have become a major part of South African music, creating a huge influence in the music industry. A number of Zulu-folk derived styles have become well known across South Africa and abroad. Zulu music has dominated many genres in South Africa, especially House music, Folk music, Acapella, Choral music and gospel. In fact, some of the most popular songs from South Africa are in Zulu.

Kwaito
Kwaito is a music genre that emerged in Johannesburg, South Africa, during the 1990s. It is a variant of house music featuring the use of African sounds and samples. Typically at a slower tempo range than other styles of house music, Kwaito often contains catchy melodic and percussive loop samples, deep bass lines, and vocals. Despite its similarities to hip hop music, Kwaito has a distinctive manner in which the lyrics are sung, rapped and shouted. American producer Diplo has described Kwaito as "slowed-down garage music," most popular among the black youth of South Africa.

Maskandi
Maskanda (or Maskandi) is a kind of Zulu folk music that is evolving with South African society. Ethekwini Online describes it as "The music played by the man on the move, the modern minstrel, today’s troubadour. It is the music of the man walking the long miles to court a bride, or to meet with his Chief; a means of transport. It is the music of the man who sings of his real life experiences, his daily joys and sorrows, his observations of the world. It’s the music of the man who’s got the Zulu blues."

Nowadays this is untrue in as much as it is no longer just the domain of men. African women - notably Busi Mhlongo - are also making Maskandi music. Maskandi music is largely popular and mostly consumed in the Kwa-Zulu Natal province, given its rich Zulu heritage and significance to the Zulu tribe. Looking at the genre from a record sales point of view...Maskandi happens to be the 2nd top selling genre in South Africa, after Gospel music. Although Maskandi music can be heard in more urban cities such as Johannesburg and Cape Town, it is important to note that it is largely the played by migrants who come to the big cities to seek a better quality of life and better employment opportunities. This music is typically considered backward and irrelevant by most city dwellers, given that the roots of the music are deeply entrenched in rural Kwa-Zulu Natal, and feature heavy elements of Zulu culture. Due to this, the music typically fails to connect with a wider audience and this is largely due to a lack of overall understanding of the genre, which subsequently leads to a lack of interest from listeners.

Although the genre has been in existence for many years, after the 90's there seemed to be no real interest shown in the music by youths and young musicians. Due to the large influences by western and pop culture, these days most musicians choose to learn and perform western genres of music such as Hip-Hop, RnB and Turn up and the likes and this leads to the problem of having very few young Maskandi musicians to carry the genre forward, putting the future of the genre at risk. However Maskandi bands still exist with bands such as The Bunny Chows Carrots who are youth activists for the genre, and have dedicated their music to the preservation and appreciation of Maskandi music, as well as traditional forms of music as a whole. The band advocates for youth and future generations to learn from and co-innovate with their more experienced counterparts, in order to ensure the secrets and intricate nuances of Maskandi are properly and correctly preserved for future generations.

Maskandi is well received and liked by the international community because of its originality, uniqueness and its difficulty to replicate. Between the 60s and early 90s Maskandi acts such as Johnston Zibokwakhe Mnyandu "Phuzekhemisi", Bhodloza Nzimande, Amatshitshi Amhlophe, Izingane Zoma, Bhekumuzi Luthuli (late) and Mfaz'Omnyama (late) contributed largely to exposing Maskandi to the international market.

Started of as Kwaito back in the 90's. Most South African rappers were influenced by Tupac. Skwatta Kamp, H20, Pro were the first to be known nationally as Tsotsi Taal rappers, in 2006 F-eezy and Molly dropped their debut albums which made the youth listen to local hip hop a lot. We also had PRO's  Red Button blow up. Kwesta also came by with Sharp Fede. Deep soweto also came with Siya Shezi, King flo, Emdee, Chaka dolla etc. The full clip on yfm gave a platform to many known kasi rappers such as Axe-Ray, Blaq P, Froz, MaseVen, Noks Matchbox, Sfilikwane etc.

Rawkat

Gqomu
Gqom is a style of music that emerged a decade into the 21st century from the city of Durban in KwaZulu Natal, South Africa. The style features wavy and bass beats produced with software such as FL Studio, and has gained prominence in London. The word gqom, sometimes expressed as qgom, igqom, gqomu or variants thereof, derives from an onomatopoeic combination of click consonants from the Zulu language that represents a hitting drum. Music connoisseurs who were actively and rigorously involved in influencing the masses to accept and embrace the new, shift-shaping sound included the likes of  South African rapper,
Okmalumkoolkat, Italian record label Gqom Oh owner, Malumz Kole, Afrotainment record label owner, DJ Tira as well as music taste-maker and personal public relations liaison, Cherish LaLa Mankai. Related artists are DJ Lag, DJ Bongz, Lord The Dj, MasterT, Dj Noffoh, Dj Nkaa, Rudeboyz, Distruction Boyz & AudioBoyz.

Mbube and Isicathamiya

Mbube is both a song, originally released in the 1940s by Solomon Linda, and a genre of South African popular music that was inspired by it. "Mbube" was recorded in 1939 and became a major hit in the country. The song was in a traditional Zulu choral style, which soon came to the attention of American musicologist Alan Lomax, who brought to the song to folk singer Pete Seeger, then of The Weavers. They made the song a Top 15 American hit in 1952 (as "Wimoweh"), though creator Solomon Linda was not credited; later, the Kingston Trio released a cover of it. Later still, The Tokens turned the song into "The Lion Sleeps Tonight", and it became a #1 American hit. The Durban-based Ladysmith Black Mambazo, formed by Joseph Shabalala in 1960, sings, among other styles, music in the mbube tradition.

References

Latest Zulu Music Platform

 
South African styles of music